The Renault Type CB Town Car is an automobile manufactured between 1912 and 1933 by Renault.

Carter was saved, but the car sunk in the Atlantic. A replica was requested by James Cameron and 20th Century Fox for their 1997 film Titanic. They looked for Carter's original documents for the vehicle, and the car was recreated almost exactly.

References

T
Cars introduced in 1912
Brass Era vehicles